Melisa Hasanbegović (born 13 April 1995) is a Bosnian football defender who plays for Sporting CP in the Campeonato Nacional Feminino in Portugal. Previously she played for SFK 2000, IK Grand Bodø, SK Slavia Praha. and Ferencváros.

International goals

References

External links 
 

1995 births
Living people
Bosnia and Herzegovina expatriate women's footballers
Kvarnsvedens IK players
Women's association football defenders
Bosnia and Herzegovina women's international footballers
Expatriate women's footballers in the Czech Republic
Expatriate women's footballers in Norway
Expatriate women's footballers in Sweden
Bosnia and Herzegovina expatriate sportspeople in Norway
Bosnia and Herzegovina expatriate sportspeople in Sweden
Bosnia and Herzegovina expatriate sportspeople in the Czech Republic
SK Slavia Praha (women) players
Ferencvárosi TC (women) footballers
Expatriate women's footballers in Hungary
Bosnia and Herzegovina expatriate sportspeople in Hungary
Czech Women's First League players
Sporting CP (women's football) players
Bosnia and Herzegovina expatriate sportspeople in Portugal
Expatriate women's footballers in Portugal
Bosnia and Herzegovina women's footballers